Sorasak Phoonjungreed, is a Thai futsal midfielder. He play for Port and currently a member of  Thailand national futsal team.

References

Sorasak Phoonjungreed
1994 births
Living people
Sorasak Phoonjungreed
Southeast Asian Games medalists in futsal
Competitors at the 2017 Southeast Asian Games